Hough is a small unincorporated rural community in Texas County, Oklahoma, United States, north-northwest of Guymon.  The townsite was officially platted on July 20, 1928. The Beaver, Meade and Englewood Railroad built through the area in the 1929-1930 timeframe, and Hough  was purposely sited along its route.  That trackage was abandoned in 1972, but the Hough Woodframe Elevator, which was situated along the tracks, still exists and is on the National Register of Historic Places listings in Texas County, Oklahoma.

Demographics

References

Shirk, George H. Oklahoma Place Names. Norman: University of Oklahoma Press, 1987. 

Unincorporated communities in Texas County, Oklahoma
Unincorporated communities in Oklahoma
Oklahoma Panhandle